Mutomo is an urban centre located in Kenya's Kitui County. It is located in former Mutomo District of which Mutomo Town was its administrative centre. It has a population of 17,000  inhabitants. It is located about 70 km from Kitui and 230 km from Nairobi. Mutomo can be reached by road through Machakos and through Kibwezi. Main schools in this town include Mutomo Girls, St. Patrick's and Mutomo Mixed Schools. Mutomo Mission Hospital, located here, is one of the most famous hospitals in the county.

The place is rich with natural resources such as limestone and coal located at Kanziko. It is a peaceful area and quite good for any business. With the upgrade of the Kitui–Kibwezi highway it has become a hotspot for business opportunities and development.

References

External links 
Mutomo Maarifa Centre

Populated places in Eastern Province (Kenya)
Kitui County